Windmill Stars Football Club is a Northern Irish intermediate football club based in Armagh, playing in the Intermediate Division A of the Mid-Ulster Football League. Club colours are orange and navy.

The club participates in the Irish Cup.

Honours

Junior honours
Irish Junior Cup: 1
2002–03

References

 

Association football clubs in Northern Ireland
Association football clubs in County Armagh
Mid-Ulster Football League clubs
Armagh (city)